Buchinsky or Buchinski is a Slavic masculine surname, its feminine counterpart is Buchinska, Buchynska or Buchinskaya. It may refer to
Charles Bronson (born Charles Dennis Buchinsky; 1921–2003), American film and television actor
Natalia Buchynska (born 1977), Ukrainian singer